Michael Dorn (born December 9, 1952) is an American actor best known for his role as the Klingon character Worf in the Star Trek franchise, appearing in all seven seasons of the television series Star Trek: The Next Generation (1987–1994), and later reprising the role in seasons four through seven of Star Trek: Deep Space Nine (1995–1999). Dorn has appeared more times as a regular cast member than any other Star Trek actor in the franchise's history, spanning five films and 277 television episodes.

Outside of the Star Trek franchise, Dorn has appeared in the television series CHiPs (1979–1982), and has had voice roles as Coldstone and Taurus in the animated series Gargoyles (1994–1997); Kalibak and John Henry Irons / Steel in Superman: The Animated Series (1996–2000); I.M. Weasel in I Am Weasel (1997–2000); Lord Darkar in the Nickelodeon dub of Winx Club (2011); and Captain Mozar in Teenage Mutant Ninja Turtles (2015–2016).

Early life
Dorn was born in Luling, Texas, the son of Allie Lee (née Nauls) and Fentress Dorn Jr. He grew up in Pasadena, California, where he studied radio and television production at Pasadena City College. Following his graduation, he pursued a career in music as a performer with several different rock music bands, traveling to San Francisco and then back to Los Angeles.

Career

Early work
Dorn first appeared on-screen in Rocky, in an uncredited role as Apollo Creed's bodyguard. Two years later, he appeared as a guest star on a 1978 episode of the television show W.E.B.. Impressed by his work, the show's producer introduced Dorn to an agent, through whom he met acting teacher Charles E. Conrad. Dorn studied with Conrad for six months, until he landed a regular role on the crime drama series CHiPs.

Star Trek

Dorn's most notable role to date is that of the Klingon Starfleet officer Lieutenant (later Lt. Commander) Worf in Star Trek: The Next Generation and Star Trek: Deep Space Nine. Dorn was the last of the main actors to be cast in The Next Generation, and prepared for his audition by isolating himself from the other actors and remaining taciturn through his interview, mimicking the personality of the character. His character proved so popular amongst fans that Dorn was added to the cast of spin-off series Deep Space Nine in an effort to boost ratings.

He has appeared on-screen in more Star Trek episodes and movies as the same character than anyone else: he appeared in 175 episodes of Star Trek: The Next Generation (missing only the episodes "Code of Honor", "Haven", and "Shades of Gray"), 102 episodes of Deep Space Nine and four Star Trek movies, bringing his total to 281 appearances as Worf. He also appeared as Worf's ancestor, Colonel Worf, in the 1991 film Star Trek VI: The Undiscovered Country. He also directed the Star Trek: Deep Space Nine episodes "In the Cards", "Inquisition" and "When It Rains...", and the Star Trek: Enterprise episode "Two Days and Two Nights".

He was one of six actors to reprise his role, in voice over, for the Star Trek: Captain's Chair virtual reality game. In 2014, he participated in the fan-produced Star Trek episode "Fairest of Them All", giving his voice to the computer of the Mirror Universe Enterprise.

In 2012, Dorn announced a desire to return to his Klingon role in a television series tentatively titled Star Trek: Captain Worf. He said: I had come up with the idea because I love [Worf] and I think he's a character that hasn't been fully developed and hasn't been fully realized. Once I started thinking about it, it became obvious to me that I wanted to at least put it out there, which I have, and the response has been pretty amazing. We've been contacted by different individuals–I can't say who and all that–about wanting to come on board and be part of this.

In April 2022, it was announced that he would be reprising his role as Worf in the third season of Star Trek: Picard, which is scheduled to air in 2023.

Other work
Dorn has appeared in a number of TV shows, films, and video games. He has been the spokesman for Neutrogena T-Gel Shampoo, and has appeared in a Dodge Dart car commercial. He appeared in a 2012 tongue-in-cheek television commercial for Chrysler as "Future Guy", a time traveler sent from the future to assist development of the 2013 Dodge Dart. He also plays the role of General Thain in the Castlevania: Hymn of Blood web series.

Following his Star Trek career, he had supporting roles in a number of independent feature films, including Shadow Hours (2000), Lessons for an Assassin (2001), and The Santa Clause trilogy, in which he appeared in a minor role as the Sandman. Dorn reprised his role as Worf for cameo appearances on Webster and Family Guy, the latter with several of his fellow Next Generation castmates. He had a recurring role on the television series Castle, playing the therapist of NYPD police detective Kate Beckett.

In March 2023, Dorn was announced as the writer for a comic starring Steel (John Henry Irons), whom he voiced in Superman: The Animated Series. Steelworks #1 will be published in June 2023, with art by Sami Basri.

Personal life
A member of the Aircraft Owners and Pilots Association, Dorn is an accomplished pilot. He has flown with the Blue Angels as well as the Thunderbirds. He has owned several jet aircraft, including a Lockheed T-33 Shooting Star, which he jokingly refers to as his "starship", a North American F-86 Sabre, and currently owns a North American Sabreliner. Dorn also serves on several aviation organizations, one of which is the Air Force Aviation Heritage Foundation, where he is on the advisory board. He has done interviews for the "Private Jets" episode of Modern Marvels on The History Channel.

Dorn stated in a 2010 interview that he had been diagnosed with an "early early" stage of prostate cancer, which led him to become a vegan.

Filmography

Film

Television

Video games

Web series

References

External links

 
 
 
 Michael Dorn: A Trek Worth Remembering

1952 births
20th-century American male actors
21st-century American male actors
20th-century African-American people
21st-century African-American people
Living people
African-American male actors
African-American television directors
American aviators
American male film actors
American male television actors
American male video game actors
American male voice actors
American television directors
Male actors from Pasadena, California
Male actors from Texas
Pasadena City College alumni
People from Caldwell County, Texas
People from Luling, Texas